Mithatpaşa station is a railway station in Adapazarı, Turkey. It is serviced by the Ada Express to Istanbul and Adaray commuter trains to Adapazarı and Arifiye, although the later has been indefinitely suspended. The station also serves the TÜVASAŞ factory located adjacent to it. Mithatpaşa was opened on 1 November 1899 by the Ottoman Anatolian Railway and later taken over by the Turkish State Railways.

References

Railway stations in Sakarya Province
1899 establishments in the Ottoman Empire
Railway stations opened in 1899
Adapazarı